Gatwick Racecourse was a racecourse in the county of Surrey, England near to Horley and Lowfield Heath. It was in use from 1891 to 1940 when it was closed at the start of the Second World War. The land is now part of London Gatwick Airport.

History

In 1890, the descendants of the de Gatwick family sold the area to the newly established Gatwick Race Course Company. A farmhouse was built around 1890, with extensive stabling.

In 1891, Gatwick Racecourse opened beside the London–Brighton railway, and a dedicated station including sidings for horse boxes. The course held steeplechase and flat races.

The first race meeting was on 7 October 1891. Its race distances were 5 furlongs to 2 miles flat and 2 miles to 4 miles 856 yards National Hunt. The Grand National was run there in 1916, 1917 and 1918, but its principal race was the Gatwick Cup.

From around 1930, the course was managed by George Gurton, who moved there from the Colchester area of Essex with his wife Ruby and two sons, Eustace Guy and Oswald George.

A small airport was built at the southeastern edge of the property, with a circular terminal building called "The Beehive". There is a pub at nearby Tinsley Green called The Beehive.

After closure

After the Second World War, the stables and racecourse were used for training by, among others, Jack Holt. The surrounding land was farmed by George Gurton and subsequently by his elder son, Eustace Guy Gurton.

The Gurton family lived in the farmhouse until 1959 and farmed the area, using the land for mixed arable. Private trainers rented the stables and used the defunct course for training. In 1957, the racecourse was chosen as the site of the second major London airport, and the stables and house were demolished around 1960. A lodge house still remains on Povey Cross Road. The Gurton family emigrated to Australia in 1959. Many of Gurton's descendants still live in the surrounding Horley, Crawley and Charlwood areas. Some members of the family are buried at Charlwood Parish Church cemetery.

The airport was expanded onto the site of the racecourse and as a result, left no evidence that there was ever one there, but there is a restaurant named the "Racecourse Restaurant" in Gatwick Airport. There are also roads around the airports boundaries called "Racecourse Road" and "Furlong Way". The racecourse's bandstand was relocated to Queens Square in Crawley.

References

External links
Gatwick Racecourse on race day
The Grand National at Gatwick
Map: Gatwick Racecourse superimposed on map of the modern Gatwick Airport

Defunct horse racing venues in England
Sports venues completed in 1891
1891 establishments in England
Gatwick Airport